Maximo Oliveras (born 2 February 1962) is a Puerto Rican long-distance runner. He competed in the men's marathon at the 1996 Summer Olympics.

References

External links
 

1962 births
Living people
Athletes (track and field) at the 1996 Summer Olympics
Puerto Rican male long-distance runners
Puerto Rican male marathon runners
Olympic track and field athletes of Puerto Rico
Place of birth missing (living people)
Olympic male marathon runners